In organic chemistry, bilane is a compound with the formula  or .  It is a tetrapyrrole, a class of compounds with four independent pyrrole rings. Specifically, the molecule can be described as four pyrrole molecules  connected in an open chain by three methylene bridges  at carbons adjacent to the nitrogens, replacing the respective hydrogens.  

The name is also used for the class of compounds formally derived from bilane proper by replacement of some additional hydrogen atoms by various functional groups.  Natural bilanes usually have side chains substituted on the two carbons in each pyrrole ring that are not adjacent to the nitrogens.  Artificial bilanes may be substituted on the bridging carbons (called meso positions).

The parent (unsubstituted) bilane is difficult to prepare and unstable, but substituted derivatives are synthesized by most living organisms as intermediates in the synthesis of natural porphyrins. Substituted bilanes may also be the starting point for the synthesis of artificial porphyrins.

Reactions
Upon treatment with aldehydes, bilanes may cyclize to give porphyrinogens and various open or closed oligomers and polymers. 

In living organisms, the biosynthesis of all natural porphyrins proceeds through the bilane preuroporphyrinogen, which is produced from four molecules of the monomer porphobilinogen, and then converted to the closed tetrapyrrole uroporphyrinogen III (or, in certain metabolic disorders, into uroporphyrinogen I). Also, the catabolism of hemoglobin in humans produces bilirubin, another linear tetrapyrrole that is a partially oxidized bilane.

References

Tetrapyrroles